Silvanigrella is a genus of the phylum Bdellovibrionota. The genus currently contains two described species: Silvanigrella aquatica and Silvanigrella paludirubra.

References

Oligoflexia
Bacteria genera